Jindřich Vágner (born 19 September 1943) is a Czech former swimmer. He competed in the men's 100 metre freestyle at the 1964 Summer Olympics.

References

External links
 

1943 births
Living people
Czech male swimmers
Olympic swimmers of Czechoslovakia
Swimmers at the 1964 Summer Olympics
People from Strakonice
Sportspeople from the South Bohemian Region